Katrin Saks (born 29 November 1956 in Tallinn) is an Estonian politician and journalist. From 1999 to 2002, she was Minister of Population Affairs in the cabinet of Mart Laar. She was the vice-chairwoman of the Social Democratic Party from 2005 to 2010. In October 2006 she became Member of the European Parliament, replacing Toomas Hendrik Ilves, who had been elected President of Estonia. She lost her seat in the 2009 European election, but shortly regained it, when on 7 April 2014 she replaced Ivari Padar who became Estonian Minister for Agriculture, until in July she was succeeded by Marju Lauristin following the 2014 European election. As of 2011, she is a director of Tallinn University Baltic Film and Media School.

Education
Estonian Diplomatic College, international relations and diplomacy (1993)
University of Tartu, journalism (1981)
Additional courses in Denmark, Norway, Belgium and the USA.

Professional Background
Director of Baltic Film and Media School (2011–currently)
Concordia International University, lecturer (1998–2000)
Open Estonia Fund, project manager (1998–1999)
Estonian Television, programme director, member of the Board of Governors (1993–1997)
Estonian Television, journalist (1977–1997)

Political Work
Member of the European Parliament, Socialist Group (2006–2009; April–June 2014)
Member of the Estonian Parliament (2003–2006),
Member, European Union Affairs Committee; Vice-chairman, Cultural Affairs Committee
Member, Estonian delegation to the Parliamentary Assembly of the Council of Europe,
rapporteur on Finno-Ugric peoples in the Russian Federation (2003–2006)
Government of the Republic of Estonia, minister (1999–2002)

Organisations
Mõõdukad Party (predecessor of the SDE) (1988), Vice-Chairman, SDE Party (2005).
Member, Broadcasting Council
Board of Trustees of Tartu University
Board of Trustees of the Estonian Music Academy
President, Union for Child Welfare

Awards
 2006: Order of the White Star, 4th class

References

External links

 
 Katrin Saks at WordPress

1956 births
Living people
University of Tartu alumni
Government ministers of Estonia
Members of the Riigikogu, 2003–2007
Social Democratic Party (Estonia) politicians
Social Democratic Party (Estonia) MEPs
MEPs for Estonia 2004–2009
MEPs for Estonia 2009–2014
Women MEPs for Estonia
Politicians from Tallinn
Women government ministers of Estonia
Women members of the Riigikogu
Recipients of the Order of the White Star, 4th Class
21st-century Estonian politicians
Members of the Riigikogu, 2007–2011